Tigervision was a subsidiary of Tiger Toys which produced video games for the Atari 2600, Atari 8-bit family, TI-99/4A, VIC-20 and  Commodore 64. Most of their games were ports. Polaris and River Patrol were originally arcade games from Taito and Orca, respectively. Marauder, Threshold, and Jawbreaker were originally computer games from Sierra On-Line. Miner 2049er was first published for the Atari 8-bit family by Big Five Software. While the Atari 8-bit version contained ten levels, it was split into two cartridges for the 2600, each sold as a separate game containing three levels.

Games
The following games were released for the Atari 2600:
Espial
Jawbreaker
King Kong
Marauder
Miner 2049er
Miner 2049er Volume II
Polaris
River Patrol
Springer
Threshold

Unreleased
Changes
Intuition
Matterhorn
Scraper Caper
Sky Lancer
Super Crush

References

Defunct video game companies of the United States
Atari 2600